Strabane railway station may refer to:

 Strabane (CDR) railway station in service 1894–1960
 Strabane (GNI) railway station in service 1847–1965